The 1953–54 season was Cardiff City F.C.'s 27th season in the Football League. They competed in the 22-team Division One, then the first tier of English football, finishing tenth.

The season would also be the last time the club was managed by Cyril Spiers who, in his second spell at the club, is still Cardiff City's second longest serving manager of all time. His fourteen years at Ninian Park placing him second only to Fred Stewart.

Season review

Partial league table

Results by round

FA Cup
After a 3–1 victory over Midland Football League side Peterborough United in the third round, Cardiff were eliminated in round four by Third Division North side Port Vale.

Welsh Cup
Drawn against Barry Town in their first match, a 1–1 draw lead to a replay with Cardiff advancing after a 4–2 win. After receiving a bye in the sixth round, Cardiff were then drawn against Merthyr Tydfil in the seventh round and advanced to the semi-finals with a 5–3 victory. The club's campaign came to an end in the semi-finals for a second year in a row after a 2–1 defeat to Flint Town United.

Players

Fixtures and results

First Division

FA Cup

Welsh Cup

See also
List of Cardiff City F.C. seasons

References

Cardiff City F.C. seasons
Association football clubs 1953–54 season
Card